John Mead was a British art director. He was employed designing the sets of more than thirty films.

Selected filmography
 Raise the Roof (1930)
 Harmony Heaven (1930)
 Suspense (1930)
 Murder! (1930)
 Compromising Daphne (1930)
 The Middle Watch (1930)
 The Flying Fool (1931)
 Lucky Girl (1932)
 Red Wagon (1933)
 The Outcast (1934)
 The Return of Bulldog Drummond (1934)
 Abdul the Damned (1935)
 Invitation to the Waltz (1935)
 Love in Exile (1936)
 Gypsy Melody (1936)
 Sensation (1936)
 Aren't Men Beasts! (1937)
 Spring Handicap (1937)
 Bulldog Drummond at Bay (1937)
 At the Villa Rose (1940)

References

Bibliography
 Bergfelder, Tim & Harris, Sue & Street, Sarah. Film Architecture and the Transnational Imagination: Set Design in 1930s European Cinema. Amsterdam University Press, 2007.

External links

British art directors
Year of birth unknown
Year of death unknown